Gammarelli (full name Ditta Annibale Gammarelli) is the official tailor of the pope. The shop opened in 1798 and is located in Rome.

History 
Gammarelli was created in 1798 and has tailored for the popes since then. It has been run by the same family for 6 generations.

The shop was created by Giovanni Antonio Gammarelli. His son Filippo took over the shop, and then Filippo's son, Annibale, succeeded his father. Annibale Gammarelli moved the store to 34 via Santa Chiara in the building of the Pontifical Ecclesiastical Academy. In 1874, Annibale moved the shop from its original location to its current spot on Via Santa Chiara 34. It's located inside the building of the Pontifical Ecclesiastical Academy. Annibale's sons Bonaventura and Giuseppe renamed the shop "Ditta Annibale Gammarelli". Bonaventura's son Annibale took over his father, followed by the sixth generation of the family: Maximillian, Lorenzo and Stefano Paolo. Pope Pius XII (1939-1958) is the only pope who selected a different tailor during his papacy.

In 2000, the shop was included in the list of historic shops of Rome.

In 2016, the 6th generation of Gammarellis took over the leadership of the shop.

Activities 
Gammarelli makes zuchettos and galeros (the wide-brimmed, tasseled hat that used to be worn by cardinals and other high-ranking prelates). Gammarelli also sells world-famous red socks. The sign on the front of the shop says Sartoria Per Ecclesiastici (clerical outfitters).

The staff is composed of a dozen workers (2003).

The tradition of bestowing a galero to the cardinal when he entered the College of Cardinals was replaced with the presentation of their zuchetto after the Second Vatican Council. When a Cardinal dies, at a "Month's Mind", which is a requiem mass held a month after their death, the galero is raised to the roof of their cathedral, there to stay until it falls or deteriorates. In addition to Popes and Cardinals, it serves many Archbishops, Bishops, Monsignors, and other prelates and priests.

Gallery

References

External links 
 Official website
 Rome Reports | Gammarelli: clothes for next Pope are ready

Clothing companies of Italy
Economy of Vatican City
Suit makers